The Somali Patriotic Movement (SPM) is a political party and paramilitary organization in Somalia, and a key faction in the Somali Civil War. Commanded originally Shukri Weyrah kaariye, Ahmed Omar Jess then by Aden Abdullahi Nur Gabyow (a defence minister under former dictator Mohamed Siad Barre), it was based in the southwestern area of the country, and had considerable influence in the leaderless country. 

Begun by a group of affected mainly Ogadeni or Absame privates led by Colonel Shukri Weyrah Karie, and colonel Bashir Bililiqo, with an area of operations centered on the Jubaland region and the Kenyan border (mid and Lower Jubba). They were early allies of the UNC in operations against Siad Barre. A key accomplishment was the seizure of Bale-Dogle air base in the days prior to Barre's flight from Mogadishu.

However, after Barre's flight, when Ali Mahdi's Manifesto Group announced the formation of an "interim government" without consulting SPM leadership, a crisis ensued. After fighting broke out between the Manifesto Group supporters and the SPM, the SPM was accused of suddenly reversing direction and allied itself with Barre, who was seeking to reestablish his regime. This reversal was angrily resisted by many of the original Ogadeni, who split off into their own faction.

The SPM thus sundered into two tribal-oriented factions:

 SPM Absame, or SPM-SNA, under Ahmed Omar Jess and Gedi Ugas Madhar
 SPM Harti, under Aden Abdillahi Nur "Gabyow" (Himself from Ogaden Absame clan: Chairman) and General Mohamed Siad Hersi "Morgan" (Militia Commander)

On August 12, 1992, the SPM mainly Absame faction joined General Aidid to form the Somali National Alliance. The SPM fractured along tribal lines, and massacres and ethnic cleansing began between the two rival factions, as well as their external enemies.

In 1998, the SPM (Harti/Absame) under General "Morgan", based out of Kismayo, founded the autonomous state of Jubaland. They were strenuously opposed by the Allied Somali Forces, which later became the Juba Valley Alliance. The SPM and ASF/JVA contended over the control of south Somalia until the JVA proved victorious, driving General "Morgan" into exile.

See also
 Somali Civil War
 Factions in the Somali Civil War

External links
Aden Abdullahi Nur Gabyow
Armed opposition in Somalia

References

Political parties in Somalia
Political parties established in 1989
Factions in the Somali Civil War
1989 establishments in Somalia